A political movement is a collective attempt by a group of people to change government policy or social values. Political movements are usually in opposition to an element of the status quo, and are often associated with a certain ideology. Some theories of political movements are the political opportunity theory, which states that political movements stem from mere circumstances, and the resource mobilization theory which states that political movements result from strategic organization and relevant resources. Political movements are also related to political parties in the sense that they both aim to make an impact on the government and that several political parties have emerged from initial political movements. While political parties are engaged with a multitude of issues, political movements tend to focus on only one major issue.

Political movement theories 
Some of the theories behind social movements have also been applied to the emergence of political movements in specific, like the political opportunity theory and the resource mobilization theory.

Political opportunity theory 
The political opportunity theory asserts that political movements occur through chance or certain opportunities and have little to do with resources, connections or grievances in society. Political opportunities can be created by possible changes in the political system, structure or by other developments in the political sphere and they are the driving force for political movements to be established.

Resource mobilization theory 
The resource mobilization theory states that political movements are the result of careful planning, organizing and fundraising rather than spontaneous uprisings or societal grievances. This theory postulates that movements rely on resources and contact to the establishment in order to fully develop. Thus, at the beginning and core of a political movement there lies a strategic mobilization of individuals.

Relation to political parties 
Political movements are different from political parties since movements are usually focused on a single issue and they have no interest in attaining office in government. A political movement is generally an informal organization and uses unconventional methods to achieve their goals. In a political party, a political organization seeks to influence or control government policy through conventional methods, usually by nominating their candidates and seating candidates in politics and governmental offices.

However, political parties and movements both aim to influence government in one way or another and both are often related to a certain ideology. Parties also participate in electoral campaigns and educational outreach or protest actions aiming to convince citizens or governments to take action on the issues and concerns which are the focus of the movement. What links political movements to parties in particular, is that some movements have turned into political parties. For example, the 15-M Movement against austerity in Spain led to the creation of the populist party Podemos and the labor movements in Brazil helped form the Brazilian Workers' Party. These types of movement parties serve to raise awareness on the main issue of their initial political movement in government, since the established parties may have neglected this issue in the past.

For groups seeking to influence policy, social movements can provide an alternative to formal electoral politics. For example, the political scientist S. Laurel Weldon has shown that women's movements and women's policy agencies have tended to be more effective in reducing violence against women than the presence of women in the legislatures.

Examples 
Some political movements have aimed to change government policy, such as the anti-war movement, the ecology movement, and the anti-globalization movement. With globalization, global citizens movements may have also emerged. Many political movements have aimed to establish or broaden the rights of subordinate groups, such as abolitionism, the women's suffrage movement, the civil rights movement, feminism, gay rights movement, the disability rights movement, the animal rights movement, or the inclusive human rights movement.  Some have represented class interests, such as the labour movement, socialism, and communism, while others have expressed national aspirations, such as anticolonialist movements, Rātana, Zionism, and Sinn Féin.  Political movements can also involve struggles to decentralize or centralize state control, as in anarchism, fascism, and Nazism.

Famous recent social movements can be classified as political movements as they have influenced policy changes at all levels of government. Political movements that have recently emerged within the US are the Black Lives Matter Movement, and the Me Too Movement. While political movements that have happened in recent years within the Middle East is the Arab Spring. While in some cases these political movements remained movements, in others they escalated into revolutions and changed the state of government.

Movements may also be named by outsiders, as with the Levellers political movement in 17th century England, which was named so as a term of disparagement. Yet admirers of the movement and its aims later came to use the term, and it is this term by which they are most known to history.

See also

General Political spectrum, political science, political history (gestalt, political thought history), political sociology (political opportunity,  resource mobilization), political structure
States Sovereignty (sovereign state), nation state, federated state, member state, nation, The Estates, Rechtsstaat
PeopleJohn Locke, Georg Hegel, Karl Marx, Max Weber, Thomas Hobbes, Michel Foucault, Alexis de Tocqueville
Political philosophy Autonomy (social identity), collective action, democracy, economic freedom, egalitarianism, equality before the law, equal opportunity, free will, social framing, gender equality,  intellectual freedom, liberty, justice (moral responsibility), political freedom (assembly, association, choice, speech), political representation (representative democracy), political legitimacy, racial equality, rights (civil liberties), social cohesion, social equality
 Political views  Conservatism, environmentalism, fascism, feminism, liberalism, Marxism, nationalism, socialism, list of political ideologies
Other Conservatism in the United States, Constitutional Movement, contentious politics, environmental movement, green politics, political aspects of Islam, political protest, sanctuary movement, Tea Party movement

References

Further reading
 Harrison, Kevin, and Tony Boyd. Understanding Political Ideas and Movements: a Guide for A2 Politics Students. Manchester: Manchester University Press, 2003.
 Opp, Karl-Dieter. Theories of Political Protest and Social Movements: a Multidisciplinary Introduction, Critique, and Synthesis. London: Routledge, 2015.
Snow, David A., Donatella Della Porta, Bert Klandermans, and Doug McAdam. The Wiley-Blackwell Encyclopedia of Social and Political Movements. Chichester, West Sussex: Wiley-Blackwell, 2013.

Social movements